The Ambin group  (Groupe d'Ambin in  French, Gruppo d'Ambin in Italian) is a sub-range of the Cottian Alps located on the French-Italian border.

Geography 
Administratively the range is divided between the Italian provincia di Torino (southern slopes) and the French département de la Savoie (northern slopes).

Borders 
The borders of Ambin group are (clockwise):
 Etiache pass (west, it connects Ambin group with Pierre Menue group);
 ruisseau d'Etache, ruisseau d'Ambin, Arc and ruisseau de la Fémaz (north);
 Mont Cenis pass (east, it connects Ambin group with the Graian Alps);
 torrente Rochemolles, Dora Riparia and Cenischia (south).

Notable summits

Mountain huts 

 Rifugio Levi Molinari (1,850 m - Exilles)
 Refuge de Bramanette (2,080 m - Bramans)
 Refuge du Petit Mont-Cenis (2,110 m - Bramans)
 Rifugio Scarfiotti (2,165 m - Bardonecchia)
 Refuge d'Ambin (2,270 m - Bramans)
 Rifugio Avanzà (2,578 m - Venaus)
 Rifugio Piero Vacca (2,670 m - Venaus)
 Rifugio Luigi Vaccarone (2,747 m - Giaglione)
 Bivacco Sigot (2,921 m - Exilles)
 Bivacco Walter Blais (2,925 m - Exilles)

Bibliography

Maps
 Italian official cartography (Istituto Geografico Militare - IGM); on-line version: www.pcn.minambiente.it
 French  official cartography (Institut Géographique National - IGN); on-line version:  www.geoportail.fr
 I.G.C. (Istituto Geografico Centrale) - Carta dei sentieri e dei rifugi scala 1:50.000 n. 1 Valli di Susa Chisone e Germanasca e 1:25.000 n. 104 Bardonecchia Monte Thabor Sauze d'Oulx

References

Mountain ranges of the Alps
Mountain ranges of Piedmont
Mountain ranges of Auvergne-Rhône-Alpes
Metropolitan City of Turin
Savoie